Édouard Clarisse (born 27 May 1972) is a retired badminton player from Mauritius, who started playing badminton in 1987, ending his career in March 2006 at the Commonwealth Games in Melbourne, Australia.

Clarisse has participated three times in the Olympic Games (Barcelona 1992, Atlanta 1996, Sydney 2000). He has also been African champion three times in the men's singles (1992, 1994, 1998), also African champion in men's doubles and the team event in 2000.

Clarisse counts several participations at the World Championships and in the Thomas Cup. He has a total of nine gold medals at Indian Ocean Island Games, hence two in the Men's singles (1993 and 1998). With his 10 titles as Mauritius champion in the men's singles and almost as many in men's Doubles, he remains until now the most successful badminton player of this small island in the Indian Ocean. 2005 he won the Kenya International.

Achievements

All-Africa Games 
Men's doubles

African Championships 
Men's singles

Men's doubles

IBF International 
Men's singles

Mixed doubles

References

External links
 

1972 births
Living people
Mauritian male badminton players
Badminton players at the 1992 Summer Olympics
Badminton players at the 1996 Summer Olympics
Badminton players at the 2000 Summer Olympics
Olympic badminton players of Mauritius
Badminton players at the 2006 Commonwealth Games
Commonwealth Games competitors for Mauritius
Competitors at the 2003 All-Africa Games
African Games bronze medalists for Mauritius
African Games medalists in badminton
20th-century Mauritian people
21st-century Mauritian people